Michael Alphonsus Shen Fu-Tsung, SJ, also known as Michel Sin, Michel Chin-fo-tsoung, Shen Fo-tsung, or Shen Fuzong (1691), was a Chinese mandarin and Jesuit from Nanking. 

He was a convert to Catholicism who was brought to Europe by the Flemish Jesuit priest Philippe Couplet, Procurator of the China Jesuit Missions in Rome. They left Macau in 1681 and visited together Flanders, Italy, France, and England. He later became a Jesuit in Portugal and died near Mozambique while returning home.

Visit to Europe

Flanders and Rome
Michael Shen Fu-Tsung arrived with Philippe Couplet by boat from Portuguese Macau in October 1682. They visited the city where Couplet was born, Mechelen. They then left for Rome, where Couplet tried to obtain a Papal authorization to celebrate mass in Chinese.

France

Shen was presented to King Louis XIV on September 15, 1684, and he demonstrated how to use chopsticks and how to write Chinese characters. He is described as participating in a royal dinner with Couplet, wearing green silk with deep blue brocade, decorated with Chinese dragons. They also visited the Maison royale de Saint-Louis, where they set up a display of Chinese silk portraits.

England and later life
After his visit in France, Shen Fu-Tsung also went to Oxford where he met with Thomas Hyde in 1685,<ref>Lewis A. Maverick review of A Cycle of Cathay: The Chinese Vogue in England During the Seventeenth and Eighteenth Centuries. by William W. Appleton. In The Far Eastern Quarterly, Vol. 11, No. 2 (Feb., 1952), pp. 246-247</ref> and he taught him some Chinese. Shen Fu-Tsung apparently communicated in Latin.

Shen Fu-Tsung also met with King James II. It is the first recorded instance of a Chinese man visiting Britain. The king was so delighted by this visit that he had his portrait made, and had it hung in his bedroom.

Shen Fu-Tsung was able to catalogue the Chinese books that were present in the Bodleian Library, and to describe their content, something which nobody had been able to do until then. He also showed the librarian the correct way to hold a Chinese book, starting with which way was up.

Shen Fu-Tsung left England in 1688 and went to Lisbon, where he entered the Society of Jesus. He died in September 1691 of a shipboard fever as he was returning to China, somewhere near Portuguese Mozambique.

See also
 Arcadio Huang, another Chinese man who was active in France a few years after Shen Fu-Tsung
 China–France relations
 Chinese diaspora in France
 Jesuit China missions
 Louis Fan (convert), another Chinese scholar (and later Catholic priest) who visited Europe in the early eighteenth century

Notes

References
 The Far Eastern Quarterly, Vol. 11, No. 2 (Feb., 1952)
 Keevak, Michael (2004) The Pretended Asian: George Psalmanazar's Eighteenth-century Formosan Hoax Wayne State University Press 
 Ballaster, Rosalind (2005) Fables of the East: Selected Tales 1662-1785 Oxford University Press 
 Mungello, David E. (1989) Curious Land: Jesuit Accommodation and the Origins of Sinology'', University of Hawaii Press, 

1650s births
1691 deaths
Year of birth uncertain
Converts to Roman Catholicism
Chinese Roman Catholics
Foreign relations of the Qing dynasty
Chinese Jesuits
Qing dynasty translators
Jesuit China missions
17th-century Chinese people
17th-century Jesuits